Governor Dempsey may refer to:

John J. Dempsey (1879–1958), 13th Governor of New Mexico
John N. Dempsey (1915–1989), 81st Governor of Connecticut